Vladyslav Viktorovych Kucheruk (born 14 February 1999) is a Ukrainian professional footballer who plays as a goalkeeper for Zorya Luhansk.

Career

Early career
Kucheruk is a product of the Podillya Khmelnytskyi and Dynamo Kyiv sportive school systems.

Dynamo Kyiv

Loan to Kolos Kovalivka
In September 2020 he went on loan to Kolos Kovalivka and made his debut in the Ukrainian Premier League on 17 October 2020, playing as the start squad player in an away losing match against Zorya Luhansk.

Loan to Chornomorets Odesa
In July 2021 he moved on loan to Chornomorets Odesa.
On 25 July 2021 he made his league debut in the losing away match against Desna Chernihiv at the Chernihiv Stadium.

Zorya Luhansk
On 10 January 2023, Kucheruk signed for Zorya Luhansk.

International career
In 2019, Kucheruk was a member of the Ukraine national under-20 football team first ever FIFA U-20 World Cup title and spent match against Colombia national under-20 football team in the winning quarter-final on 7 June 2019.

Honours

International

Ukraine U20
 FIFA U-20 World Cup: 2019

References

External links 
 
 

1999 births
Living people
Footballers from Vinnytsia
Ukrainian footballers
Association football goalkeepers
FC Dynamo Kyiv players
FC Kolos Kovalivka players
FC Chornomorets Odesa players
FC Zorya Luhansk players
Ukrainian Premier League players
Ukraine youth international footballers
Ukraine under-21 international footballers